The state elections in São Paulo in 2010 were held on October 3 as part of the general elections in Brazil. At this time, elections were held in all 26 Brazilian states and the Federal District. Citizens eligible to vote elected the president, the governor and two senators per state, plus state and federal deputies. Since none of the candidates for governor to the presidency and some got more than half the valid votes, a runoff was held on October 31. In the presidential election was a runoff between Dilma Rousseff (PT) and José Serra (PSDB) with the victory of Dilma. In São Paulo there was no runoff for governor. Under the Federal Constitution, the President and the governors are directly elected for a term of four years, with a limit of two terms. President Luiz Inácio Lula da Silva (PT) can not be re-elected, since he was elected twice in 2002 and 2006. As Governor José Serra resigned in April to run for the presidency, Alberto Goldman (PSDB) became governor, but has not applied for the position.

The main candidates were Geraldo Alckmin (PSDB), Aloízio Mercadante (PT), Celso Russomanno (PP), Paulo Skaf (PSB), Fabio Feldmann (PV). Geraldo Alckmin (PSDB) was elected in the first round with more than 11 million votes.

Candidates

Governor

Senator

Results

Governor

Senator 

2010 Brazilian gubernatorial elections
October 2010 events in South America
2010